International Rome Film Fest is a film festival that takes place in Rome during the month of October. The name in Italian is Festa del Cinema di Roma.

Sections
The Rome Film Festival official program is divided into several sections:

Cinema d'Oggi
A selection of feature films, with priority given to world premieres. At the end of each screening, the audience votes for the People's Choice Award  | Cinema d'Oggi.

Gala
Feature films that are world premieres, international or European premieres.

Mondo Genere
Feature films from various genres that are world, international or European premieres, with priority given to world premieres.

Prospettive Italia
World premieres highlighting new trends in Italian cinema. At the end of each screening, the audience votes for the People's Choice Award  |  Cinema Italia (Fiction) and the People's Choice Award  | Cinema Italia (Documentary).

Alice nella Città
Devoted to children films, this sections has two competitive subsections, one for over-12 films and the other under-12.

Awards
The Rome Film Festival award is a silver statuette shaped after the Roman Emperor Marcus Aurelius statue, placed in Michelangelo's Campidoglio Square.

BNL People’s Choice Award | Gala
The winning film's prize money is given to its Italian distributor, or, if no Italian distributor buys it within six months, to its international seller.

2014: Trash (Brazil, UK), directed by Stephen Daldry

People’s Choice Award | Cinema d’Oggi

2014: 12 Citizens (China), directed by Zu Ang

People’s Choice Award | Mondo Genere

2014: Haider (India), directed by Vishal Bhardwaj

People’s Choice Award | Cinema Italia (Fiction)

2014: Fino a qui tutto bene, directed by Roan Johnson

People’s Choice Award | Cinema Italia (Doc)
2014: Looking for Kadija, directed by Francesco G. Raganato

Winners

Best Film 
2006: Playing the Victim by Kirill Serebrennikov
2007: Juno by Jason Reitman
2008: Opium War by Siddiq Barmak
2009: Broderskab by Nicolo Donato
2010: Kill Me Please by Olias Barco
2011: Un cuento chino by Sebastián Borensztein
2012: Marfa Girl by Larry Clark
2013: Tir by Alberto Fasulo

Best Actor 
2006: Giorgio Colangeli (in Salty Air)
2007: Rade Šerbedžija (in Fugitive Pieces)
2008: Bohdan Stupka (in Serce na dloni)
2009: Sergio Castellitto (in Alza la testa)
2010: Toni Servillo (in Una vita tranquilla)
2011: Guillaume Canet (in Une vie meilleure)
2012: Jeremie Elkaim (in Hand in the Hand)
2013: Matthew McConaughey (in Dallas Buyers Club)

Best Actress 
2006: Ariane Ascaride (in Le voyage en Arménie)
2007: Jiang Wenli (in And the Spring Comes)
2008: Donatella Finocchiaro (in Galantuomini)
2009: Helen Mirren (in The Last Station)
2010: All of the actresses (in Las buenas hierbas)
2011: Noomi Rapace (in Babycall)
2012: Isabella Ferrari (in And They Call It Summer)
2013: Scarlett Johansson (in Her)

Jury Special Prize 
2006: This Is England by Shane Meadows
2010: Poll by Chris Kraus
2011: The Eye of the Storm by Fred Schepisi
2011: Circumstance by Maryam Keshavarz
2012: Alì ha gli occhi azzurri by Claudio Giovannesi
2013: Quod Erat Demonstrandum by Andrei Gruzsniczk

IMAIE Acting Award 
2006: Sean Connery
2007: Sophia Loren
2008: Clint Eastwood
2009: Meryl Streep
2010: Julianne Moore
2011: Richard Gere

Structure 
The Rome Film Festival is produced by the Cinema per Roma Foundation, whose president is Laura Delli Colli. The General Manager is Francesca Via.

The Artistic Director of the Festival is Antonio Monda.

See also
Venice Film Festival
Rome Quadriennale
Rome Independent Cinema Festival
Cento Pittori via Margutta

References

External links

International Rome Film Festival Official Website

Film festivals in Rome
2006 establishments in Italy
Annual events in Italy
Recurring events established in 2006
Autumn events in Italy
Italian film awards